The 2018 Team Speedway Junior European Championship was the 11th Team Speedway Junior European Championship season. It was organised by the Fédération Internationale de Motocyclisme and was the 7th as an under 21 years of age event.

The final took place on 1 September 2018 in Daugavpils, Latvia. The defending champions Poland finally lost after six consecutive title wins. The winners were Denmark.

Results

Final
  Daugavpils
 1 September 2018

See also 
 2018 Team Speedway Junior World Championship
 2018 Individual Speedway Junior European Championship

References 

2018
European Team Junior